Strictly Physical is the second studio album by all-female German pop trio Monrose. It was released by Starwatch Music in association with Cheyenne Records and Warner Music on 21 September 2007 in German-speaking Europe and on 8 October 2007 in parts of Eastern Europe. Released only nine months after its best-selling predecessor Temptation (2006), the album took Monrose's work further into dance and electro music, featuring main production by Danish producers Remee, Thomas Troelsen, and Peter Biker, as well as British composers from production collectives Jiant, and Snowflakers.

Upon its release, Strictly Physical debuted at number two on the German Albums Chart and reached the top ten in both Austria and Switzerland. It was eventually certified gold by the Bundesverband Musikindustrie (BVMI) and International Federation of the Phonographic Industry (IFPI) in Germany and Austria, respectively. Named after its second single which was released a week prior to the album, Strictly Physical spawned three singles, also including the band's second non-consecutive number-one hit "Hot Summer" and the Billy Mann-penned top ten ballad "What You Don't Know."

Background
In fall 2006, Senna Gammour, Bahar Kizil, and Mandy Capristo won the fifth installment of German reality talent show Popstars and formed the trio Monrose. Their debut single "Shame" was an instant number-one success throughout German-speaking Europe, as the fastest selling CD single of 2006 and the biggest-downloaded song since the introduction of the legal digital download charts in Germany in 2004. The band's debut album, Temptation debuted on top of the Austrian, German and Swiss albums charts and was certified platinum by the IFPI for more than 200,000 copies sold within its first two weeks of release. It eventually sold more than 600,000 copies domestically.

In early 2007, the trio qualified for the German national pre-selection of the Eurovision Song Contest 2007, organized and broadcast by the ARD, with their second single "Even Heaven Cries". Although they were considered early favourites by the media, the band eventually finished second. Following this, the band announced their Venus Temptation Tour with twenty dates, beginning at the Hanover Capitol on 29 April 2007. Sponsored by Global Gillette, the concert tour was accompanied by intense media coverage since it failed to produce any sold-out show, and thus four concerts had to be cancelled due to low ticket sales.

Critical response

Strictly Physical received a generally mixed reception from music critics. Musikwoche felt the album distinguished from its previous release by its growth and major production on international standards. The magazine ranked "Hot Summer", "Strictly Physical" and "What You Don't Know" among the best tracks on the album. Julian Stetter from Laut.de called the album a "more mature and individual" but generally "well-snitched" output in comparison with the band's debut album. He praised the song for its experimental production towards electro and contemporary R&B music.

Commercial performance
While the album failed to reprise the huge success of Temptation, missing a number-one peak anywhere, it became another success for the band: It debuted at number 2 on the German Media Control albums chart and reached the top 10 in Austria and Switzerland, shipping more than 90.000 copies in its first week of release. As of January 2008, Strictly Physical has been certified gold by both the Austrian and the German branch of the IFPI for more than 50,000 and 100,000 sold copies respectively.

The album spawned three singles, however, a fourth was scrapped in favour of production of a new album. The lead single "Hot Summer" became the band's second number-one hit in Austria, Germany and Switzerland and one of the biggest-selling songs of the year on German online music stores, also obtaining success in Scandinavia, Eastern Europe and the Benelux states. Its follow-up single "Strictly Physical" became Monrose's first top 10 entry on the Polish Top 50 since their debut release "Shame" (2006), while the ballad "What You Don't Know" became their fifth consecutive top 10 single in Germany, although it failed to reach the top 20 in Switzerland.

Track listing

Notes
 denotes additional producer
Sample credits
 "Just like That" contains a sample of "You're Not Alone" (1996) as performed by Olive.

Credits and personnel
Credits adapted from the liner notes of Strictly Physical.

Performers and musicians

 Christian Ballard – drums, percussion
 Deborah French – backing Vocals
 Tim Hawes – guitar
 Pete Kirtley – bass
 Andrew Murray – keyboards
 Thomas Troelsen – keyboards

Technical

 Christian Ballard – vocal assistance
 Peter Biker – producer
 Andreas Hviid – mixing
 Jiant – mixing, producer
 Andrew Lunch – engineer
 Peter Mark – mixing
 Pete "Boxsta" Martin – producer
 Andrew Murray – vocal assistance
 Mad Nilsson – mixing
 Remee – producer, vocal assistance
 Snowflakes – mixing, producer
 Claus Üblacker – engineer
 Hanif Wiliams – engineer
 Thomas Troelsen – producer, programming

Charts

Weekly charts

Monthly charts

Certifications

Release history

Cover versions
Spanish singer Soraya Arnelas covered the song "Rebound" on her 4th album Sin Miedo. Korean boyband Super Junior covered "Just Like That" for their third studio album Sorry, Sorry.

References

External links
 

2007 albums
Albums produced by Thomas Troelsen
Monrose albums
Warner Music Group albums